The Lakeshore Press is an edition of The Grand Rapids Press which competes with The Holland Sentinel in southwestern Ottawa County, Michigan, primarily in Holland, Michigan.

It has been published since the mid-1980s when it was known as The Grand Rapids Press-Lakeshore Edition.

Originally a separately inserted section published six days a week (Saturdays were excluded).  The stories now run in the main sections of the Press with a supplemental section on Sundays.

See also
 The Grand Rapids Press

Newspapers published in Michigan